Dar Balut (also Romanized as Dār Balūţ) is a village in Fathabad Rural District, in the Central District of Qasr-e Shirin County, Kermanshah Province, Iran. At the 2006 census, its population was 135, in 33 families.

References 

Populated places in Qasr-e Shirin County